Shirilikha is a rural locality (a village) in Klyazminskoye Rural Settlement, Kovrovsky District, Vladimir Oblast, Russia. The population was 23 as of 2010.

Geography 
Shirilikha is located 24 km northeast of Kovrov (the district's administrative centre) by road. Vereyki is the nearest rural locality.

References 

Rural localities in Kovrovsky District